This article lists some properties of sets of real numbers. The general study of these concepts forms descriptive set theory, which has a rather different emphasis from general topology.

Definability properties
 Borel set  
 Analytic set  
 C-measurable set  
 Projective set  
 Inductive set  
 Infinity-Borel set  
 Suslin set  
 Homogeneously Suslin set  
 Weakly homogeneously Suslin set  
 Set of uniqueness

Regularity properties
 Property of Baire  
 Lebesgue measurable  
 Universally measurable set  
 Perfect set property  
 Universally Baire set

Largeness and smallness properties
 Meager set  
 Comeager set - A comeager set is one whose complement is meager.
 Null set  
 Conull set  
 Dense set  
 Nowhere dense set

Real numbers
Real numbers